Cen Shen or Cen Can, 715–770, was one of the great Chinese poets of the Tang dynasty. His poems were included in the Three Hundred Poems anthology.

Name
He is also called Cen Jiazhou.

During the reign of Emperor Suzong he was made governor of Jia Prefecture (Jiazhou in Chinese), which earned him the name Cen Jiazhou.

Life 

He was born to a bureaucratic family in Nanyang (in today's Henan), but later moved to Jiangling, Jizhou (in today's Hubei). His great-grandfather Cen Wenben, granduncle Cen Changqian and uncle Cen Xi were all chancellors. His father Cen Zhi was Governor (Cishi) of Jingzhou. When Cen Shen was 10, his father died, and the financial situation of his family worsened. After then, Cen learned with assiduity, reading a lot of scriptures and history books. He moved to Chang'an when he was 20 and obtained jinshi in 744. 

In 749, Cen's ambitions lead him towards a stint of military service which would last about ten years, where he served as a subordinate to General Gao Xianzhi, and, later, Feng Changqing.  In about 751, Cen met Gao Shi and Du Fu, and the three had become good friends. All three were poets. Cen's other friend was the great Tang poet Li Bai, who composed a poem titled "Bring in the Wine", and included a verse which mentioned his friend Cen Shen. ..."To the old master, Cen"... Bring in the wine! Let your cups never rest! Let me sing you a song! Let your ears attend!"

Cen Shen lived through the period from 755 through 763 when the An-Shi disturbances shook the land, spreading civil war, disaster, and all sorts of turmoil throughout the northern parts of China.

During this period he held several assignments in the Central Asian outposts of the far-reaching Tang empire. Having supported the loyalist cause, he succeeded to a number of provincial posts (primarily in Sichuan) under the restoration until his retirement in 768.

Cen's early poems were always landscape poems, although this is not the case of his later ones.

Cen served in the northwest frontier territories area for about ten years, his experience in this area with its harsh climate and the relentless combat of the times made a deep impact on his poetry.

Poems
Seven of Cen Can's poems were included in the famous anthology Three Hundred Tang Poems, including:

 Ascending the Pagoda at the Temple of Kind Favour with Gao Shi and Xue Ju
 A Song of Running-horse River in Farewell to General Feng of the Western Expedition
 A Song of Wheel Tower in Farewell to General Feng of the Western Expedition
 A Song of White Snow in Farewell to Field-clerk Wu Going Home
 A Message to Censor Du Fu at His Office in the Left Court
 An Early Audience at the Palace of Light Harmonizing Secretary Jia Zhi's Poem
 On Meeting a Messenger to the Capital

His collected works are in scrolls (sections) 198 through 201 of the Collected Tang Poems.

See also

Tang poetry
Three Hundred Tang Poems
Volume 67 of the Book of the Later Han, for information on Cen Can's ancestor Cen Zhi, and his life during the Disasters of Partisan Prohibitions (in Chinese)

References

Bibliography
Davis, A. R. (Albert Richard), Editor and Introduction (1970), The Penguin Book of Chinese Verse. (Baltimore: Penguin Books).
Liu, Wu-chi and Irving Lo, eds., (1975). Sunflower Splendor: Three Thousand Years of Chinese Poetry. Bloomington: Indiana University.
Wu, John C. H. (1972). The Four Seasons of Tang Poetry. Rutland, Vermont: Charles E.Tuttle.

External links

 
Books of the Quan Tangshi that include collected poems of Cen Shen at the Chinese Text Project:
Book 198
Book 199
Book 200
Book 201

Three Hundred Tang Poems poets
770 deaths
Writers from Nanyang, Henan
Poets from Henan
Year of birth unknown
8th-century Chinese poets
715 births